The 2019 Craven District Council election took place on 2 May 2019 to elect members of Craven District Council in England.

Results

Ward results

Bentham

Embsay with Eastby

Gargrave & Malhamdale

Glusburn

Skipton East

Skipton North

Skipton South

Skipton West

Sutton-in-Craven

Upper Wharfedale (by-election)

West Craven

By-elections between 2019 and 2023

Barden Fell by-election
A by-election was held in Barden Fell on 6 May 2021 after the disqualification of independent councillor David Pighills due to non-attendance. Pighills ran in the by-election and won.

Penyghent by-election
A by-election was held in Penyghent on 6 May 2021 after the death of Conservative councillor Richard Welch. The seat was won by Conservative candidate Robert Ogden.

References

2019 English local elections
May 2019 events in the United Kingdom
2019
2010s in North Yorkshire